Monic Hendrickx (born 3 December 1966 in Sint Anthonis) is a Dutch actress. She has won several awards during her career including four Golden Calf awards for Best Actress at the Nederlands Film Festival, the Jury Award at the 2001 Newport Beach Film Festival and the Best Actress Award at the 1999 Buenos Aires International Festival of Independent Cinema.

Early life

Monic Hendrickx was born in 1966 in the Netherlands. At the age of three, she and her family moved to Paramaribo, Suriname. Eventually Hendrickx started her acting education at Toneelschool in Maastricht.

Career

Hendrickx made her screen debut in The Polish Bride. 

In 2007 she filmed an English language adaptation of The Polish Bride in Australia. The film was called Unfinished Sky and her character was changed from a Polish woman to an Afghani refugee. For her performance, she won the 2008 AFI Award for Best Actress in a Leading Role.

From 2010 to 2017, she played the lead role of crime boss Carmen van Walraven in the five seasons of Dutch series Penoza, known in some countries as Black Widow. She won awards for her work on the show, including the Golden Calf for Best Actress in a TV-Drama in 2013.

In 2018, Hendrickx was a presenter on Crown Witness (Game Show).  She appeared on The Voice Senior.  That same year, it was announced that she would appear in the international vampire series Heirs of the Night.

Selected filmography

References

External links
 

1966 births
Living people
Dutch actresses
Dutch film actresses
Dutch television actresses
Golden Calf winners
People from Sint Anthonis
20th-century Dutch actresses
21st-century Dutch actresses
Best Actress AACTA Award winners